The Pied Piper of Hamelin is a figure in German folklore.

Pied Piper of Hamelin may also refer to:

"The Pied Piper of Hamelin", an 1842 narrative poem from Robert Browning's Dramatic Lyrics
The Pied Piper of Hamelin (1957 film), a made-for-television film starring Van Johnson in the title role
The Pied Piper of Hamelin (1918 film), a 1918 German silent drama film
The Pied Piper of Hamlin, a 1992 Australian animated film produced by Burbank Animation Studios
The Pied Piper of Hamelin, a mural by Maxfield Parrish

See also

 Violinist of Hameln, a manga series
 Pied Piper (disambiguation)
 Hamelin (disambiguation)